Hjörsey is the largest island in western Iceland and the third largest in Iceland. It was part of the traditional county of Mýrasýsla; there used to be a church on Hjörsey, but it was taken apart in 1896. The island was also formerly home to a farm. While there is no human population on the island, a wild herd of horses is able to roam the island freely.

References

Southwest Iceland
Uninhabited islands of Iceland
Islands of Iceland